Turck is a German manufacturing company.

Turck may also refer to:

Turck, Kansas, a place in the United States
Eliza Turck (1832–1891), English painter and writer
Ludwig Türck (1810–1868), Austrian neurologist

See also
Turk (disambiguation)